Saxinis deserticola is a species of case-bearing leaf beetle in the family Chrysomelidae. It is found in Central America and North America.

Subspecies
These two subspecies belong to the species Saxinis deserticola:
 Saxinis deserticola deserticola Moldenke, 1970 i c g
 Saxinis deserticola mojavensis Moldenke, 1970 i c g
Data sources: i = ITIS, c = Catalogue of Life, g = GBIF, b = Bugguide.net

References

Further reading

 

Clytrini
Articles created by Qbugbot
Beetles described in 1970